Koen Wesdorp (born 9 November 1997) is a Dutch football player. He plays for ASWH.

Club career
He made his Eerste Divisie debut for Helmond Sport on 31 August 2018 in a game against Jong PSV, as a starter.

On 2 September 2019, Wesdorp joined ASWH.

References

External links
 

1997 births
Sportspeople from Bergen op Zoom
Living people
Dutch footballers
Association football midfielders
Helmond Sport players
ASWH players
Eerste Divisie players
Footballers from North Brabant